Simsir (Simsara) is a rural locality (a selo) in Osmanyurtovsky Selsoviet, Khasavyurtovsky District, Republic of Dagestan, Russia. The population was 1,062 as of 2010. There are 10 streets.

Geography 
Simsir is located 9 km northwest of Khasavyurt (the district's administrative centre) by road. Osmanyurt is the nearest rural locality.

References 

Rural localities in Khasavyurtovsky District